San Diego Yacht Club is a yacht club located in San Diego Bay. It is located in Point Loma across from a spit of land known as Shelter Island.

Facilities 

The San Diego Yacht Club facility has a main dining room and outdoor deck seating, a bar, banquet space, a sailing center, a library, a swimming pool, saunas, hot tub, gym, tennis courts, and a pavilion equipped with a barbecue.  There are wet and dry slips for member use for a monthly fee. The wet slips can accommodate boats up to 90 feet in length, and the dry slips are for smaller boats up to 23 feet in length.

SDYC leases an outstation on Catalina Island from the Catalina Island Conservancy.  The outstation is named Buffalo Beach and is located at the White's landing, Long Point area.  The outstation offers resources for club members such as cabins and tents for rent, showers, stoves, bathrooms, and cooking utensils.  A dockmaster tends the outstation six months a year.

Fleets 
San Diego Yacht Club is home to multiple fleets, many of which race regularly.  These include Lehman 12s, PCs, Stars, Etchells,  Finns, and an adult Sabot fleet.  There is also a model yacht fleet which races CR914s.  Most of the larger boats race outside of San Diego Bay in the Pacific Ocean.

Regattas 
The San Diego Yacht Club was the original home of the Sir Thomas Lipton Cup, one of the pre-eminent events in Southern California racing, which is held in the ocean off San Diego every year.
San Diego Yacht Club was the home of the America's Cup from 1988 to 1995 and hosted three America's Cup races during that time.
San Diego Yacht Club hosted the 2009 Snipe World Championship.
The San Diego Yacht Club's signature regatta is the San Diego Yachting Cup, founded in 1972 by Gerry Driscoll. In some years that regatta also includes the United States Ton Cup Championship, a qualifying event for the IOR World Championship.

Junior Sailing Program 
San Diego Yacht Club boasts one of the largest and oldest junior sailing programs in the country.  Founded in 1928 by Staff Commodore Joe Jessop, its initial objective was to teach “swimming, boat care, racing tactics, and sportsmanship”. The initial class consisted of Robert Town (the 1928 Junior Commodore), brothers Gordon Frost, Sr.* and Albert A. Frost, Jr.*, Robert Merit, Grant Stone and Walter Fisch. Of these six juniors, two became future commodores of the San Diego Yacht Club. Lessons were taught in Sea Mews and Starlets, a junior trainer that was a smaller version of the popular Star class.  Races for the Starlets were held in the Bay. Two years later in 1930 the American Starlet Association was created with Gordon Frost serving as its first Commodore.

The San Diego Yacht Club Junior Sailing Program has evolved into a year-round training program involving around 200 youth sailors every year.  The Junior Program consists of a full-time junior program director, coaches, maintenance and administrative staff. Facilities include a junior clubhouse, tool room, Sabot and Laser storage spaces, sail and boat wash areas and two launching ramps. Members of the Junior Program have access to the junior charter fleet that includes 25 Sabots, 18 Optimists, Lasers (and Radials), CFJs and 420s. Also included in the fleet are the SDYC Jr. race committee boat the Al Frost Sr., a dozen Whaler chase boats, inflatables, and multi-boat trailers for travel to away regattas.

Throughout the year, events are scheduled for sailors of all ability levels including special events, field trips, racing clinics, a very active after-school program, and practices. During the summer months, the Junior Program offers an eight-week summer sailing and racing program.

The result of coaching, learning and racing has led to the San Diego Yacht Club Youth Program's success in local, area, national and international competitions. In the recent past, SDYC Juniors have won the US Sailing Youth Championships Single-handed trophy nine times and the Double-handed trophy four times. SDYC juniors won the Interscholastic Sailing Association's National Championships in 1993, 1996, 1999 and 2001–2005 and have placed in the top three each year. The alumni of the SDYC Junior Program compete at the highest international levels. Olympic Gold, Silver and Bronze medalists, World and National Champions in several classes and America's Cup competitors are all products of SDYC's Junior Sailing Program. Olympic hopeful Andrew Campbell was a part of the Junior program.  Other notable juniors included Adam Roberts, Graham Biehl, Cameron Biehl, Jake LaDow, Judge Ryan, Grace McCarthy, and Jake Reynolds, many of whom continued their sport at college.  Several high school sailing teams also sail out of the San Diego Yacht Club, including the Point Loma, Bishop's, Francis Parker, and Cathedral Catholic High School sailing teams.

America's Cup history 
The San Diego Yacht Club won the America's Cup in 1987, 1988, and 1992, hosting the event in 1988, 1992, and 1995.

Prominent members 
Prominent members include Dennis Conner, skipper in several America's Cup races, and his racing syndicate Team Dennis Conner, which competed under the SDYC flag; J. J. Isler, the first woman elected to the Sailing World Hall of Fame; and Roy Disney, a member of the Disney family and celebrated yachtsman best known for his success in the Transpacific Yacht Race.

References

External links 
 

 
Point Loma, San Diego
Organizations based in San Diego
1886 establishments in California
1987 America's Cup
Yacht clubs in the United States